Zdravko Milev Milev (October 25, 1929 in Targovishte Bulgaria – January 1, 1984 in Sofia Bulgaria) was a Bulgarian chess International Master.

He became an International Master in 1952 after becoming Bulgarian National Champion. He went on to win the national championship again in 1960 and 1961.

References

1929 births
1984 deaths
Bulgarian chess players
Chess International Masters
People from Targovishte
20th-century chess players